USS Lookout (YAGR/AGR-2) was a , converted from a Liberty Ship, acquired by the US Navy in 1954. She was reconfigured as a radar picket ship and assigned to radar picket duty in the North Atlantic Ocean as part of the Distant Early Warning Line.

Construction 
Lookout (YAGR-2) was laid down on 5 April  1945, under a Maritime Commission (MARCOM) contract, MC hull 3139, as the Liberty Ship Claude Kitchin, by J.A. Jones Construction, Panama City, Florida. She was launched 24 May 1945; sponsored by Mrs. F. D. Burge; and delivered 25 June 1945, to the United Fruit Company.

Service history
She was soon placed into the National Defense Reserve Fleet until 13 August 1954, when she was acquired by the US Navy. She was converted to a radar picket ship at the Charleston Navy Yard, Charleston, South Carolina, and commissioned Lookout (YAGR-2), 5 March 1955.

After shakedown off Newport, Rhode Island, Lookout was assigned to radar picket duty in the 1st Naval District. From 1956 to 1965, she operated on the Atlantic Ocean perimeter of the radar defense net established around the United States to warn of surprise air attack. On 28 September 1958, her classification was changed to AGR-2. Lookouts periods of 20 to 30 days at sea were alternated with inport replenishment at Davisville, Rhode Island.
 
By the time she completed her 10th year of service in the spring of 1965, Lookout had distinguished herself in the defense of the Nation.

Decommissioning
She arrived Bayonne, New Jersey, 23 June, and decommissioned there 12 July 1965. Her name was struck from the Naval Register 1 September 1965. Lookout was transferred to the National Defense Reserve Fleet, Hudson River Reserve Fleet, Jones Point, New York, where she remained until she was sold for scrap in 1970, to a scrapping firm in Spain.

Military awards and honors 

Lookouts crew was eligible for the following medals:
 National Defense Service Medal
 Navy Expeditionary Medal (2 awards)

See also 
 United States Navy
 Radar picket

References

Bibliography

External links 
 

 

Liberty ships
Ships built in Panama City, Florida
1945 ships
World War II merchant ships of the United States
Guardian-class radar picket ships
Cold War auxiliary ships of the United States
Hudson River Reserve Fleet